Class is a British television programme, which aired on CBBC until 2010. It is a comedy sketch show set in a school. The main characters are all played by Sam Nixon and Mark Rhodes who are one of CBBC's most popular duos. The single thirty-minute episode of Class was produced in aid of Comic Relief.

Overview

This is a sketch show, which features:

The Headteacher and his trusty companion
Two students who get up to no good in class when the teacher is not looking
The two frogs, who plan to blow the whole school by using their explosives
The Dinner Ladies
Max, the cool maths teacher

Airing

The programme airs on CBBC only, around 5:00.

External links
 CBBC Official Website
 CBBC programme page

BBC children's television shows
2010s British children's television series